Deetjen's Big Sur Inn, a collection of single wall buildings, cabins, and a restaurant in Castro Canyon, was one of the first visitor accommodation to offer overnight lodging and meals to Big Sur, California visitors and travelers after the opening of Highway 1 in 1937. Helmuth Deetjen initially built cottages for others in Carmel, and was attracted to the Big Sur coast that reminded him of Norway. In 1926, he bought  and began construction of a home. He met Helen Haight and when Highway 1 was completed in 1937, they opened an inn. Helmuth managed the Inn until his death in October 1972, when its operation passed to a non-profit foundation. The Inn was closed for a short time after the Soberanes Fire and subsequent winter floods damaged several structures.

History 

Helmuth Deetjen emigrated from Bergen, Norway and arrived in New York City about 1916, where he lived in Brooklyn and worked in construction. He arrived in Carmel and met Helen Haight, then employed as a private nurse. She had been born in Georgia and came with her mother and two siblings to California before 1900. She had been a governess for a family in Oakland and later a buyer for the White House department store in San Francisco. They both liked the Big Sur region and  camped along the coast.

In 1926, Helmuth bought  from Castro, whose father David Castro bought the land in the late 1800s. He filled in the ravine in Castro Canyon to create a level construction site. Then he began construction of a building. Helmuth and Helen moved to Big Sur in the early 1930s. They lived in a tent at first, then Helmuth built a large barn of timbers obtained from an obsolete wharf along Cannery Row in Monterey.

He built several small Norwegian style cottages and bought more land, until they owned . As was the custom of the day, the couple welcomed travelers along the wagon road that connected Big Sur to Monterey, a trip that could take up to three days. On August 22, 1936, they bought an additional  of the former Castro Ranch.

They added a restaurant in 1939 run by Helen that became known for its excellent food. Helmuth made and sold hand-carved candle sticks, bowls, benches, tables, as well as cabinets in a shop next to the restaurant. The Deetjens came to be known in the area as "Grandpa" and "Grandma" to everyone. They formally married in early October, 1938.

The Hayloft Building has a number of historic features, including glass Helmuth made himself in King City and brought over the mountains to Big Sur by mule. He directed in his will that the state Department of Parks and Recreation take over the property. The estate trustee next directed that the property be offered to the National Historical Foundation, but they declined. Monterey County was given a chance at the land and buildings, but the Monterey County Parks Department estimated a new water system would cost hundreds of thousands of dollars, and the county rejected the offer. The Board of Supervisors instead asked the Superior Court to permit them to turn it over to a qualified non-profit.

Present day 

The land and buildings are owned by Deetjens Big Sur Inn Preservation Foundation Inc, representing Deetjen's estate, whose president is Kent Seavey of Pacific Grove, former curator of the California Historical Society and former director of the Carmel Museum of Art. In 1990 the inn was listed on the National Register of Historic Places.

Accommodations 

The cottages and rooms are simple. There are no television, telephones, Internet service, or cell service. None of the 20 rooms are alike. "Grampa's," for instance, has an antique pump organ and a record player with the Deetjens' personal collection of albums, and "Stokes" is a converted woodworking shop. "Stokes" is named for Stokes Evans, a native of Burlington County, New Jersey, who lived and worked at the Inn from the 50's to 70's.   Fifteen of the rooms contain private baths, and 11 have fireplaces. When open, room rates range from $115-$290 per night.

Closure 

The Inn was closed due to the Soberanes Fire in 2017 and remained closed due to subsequent damage during the following winter. The landowner reported $181,723 in storm damage repairs and assets of $1,333,186 in 2017. , the Inn and restaurant have reopened.

Notes

External links 

 Deetjen's Big Sur Inn

American Craftsman architecture in California
Buildings and structures in Monterey County, California
History of Monterey County, California
Hotel buildings on the National Register of Historic Places in California
National Register of Historic Places in Monterey County, California
Rustic architecture in California
Tourist attractions in Monterey County, California